Anthem Moss (Born 9 June 1985), or Anthimos Ananiadis, is a Greek actor and model best known from his leading role in Maria, i Aschimi, the Greek edition of the television series Ugly Betty.  For most of 2007-2008, he simultaneously played the lead role of Benjamin Braddock in The Graduate at the Britain Theatre.

Early life
Ananiadis was born in Thessaloniki (Greece) where he started studying theatre at the age of 12. After joining the National Drama School of Greece and landing an award-winning role for This is our Youth (2004) as “Breakthrough Artist of the Year,” he went on to perform in the opening ceremony of the 2004 Olympic Games as “Love.” After spending a year in the army, Anthimos returned to the silver screen in Loathing and Camouflage (2005), which was both a commercial and critical success. By 2006, his leading role in Straight Story, the most successful movie in the history of Greece, earned him a nomination for “Best Leading Actor” in the Thessaloniki International Film Festival. Then his role as “Alexis” in the hit TV series Ugly Maria earned him another nomination as “Best Leading Man” at the TV Faces Award. In 2007, after a critically acclaimed performance as Benjamin Braddock in the stage production of The Graduate, he also went on to star in the Greek version of Surfs Up (2007) and numerous other film, TV and stage productions.

In his first year in Los Angeles, Anthem landed the leading role in the movie "1001 Ways To Enjoy The Missionary Position" opposite Amanda Plummer and the leading role in the film " Sol". He has also starred in another five independent feature films such as "Brief Star" directed by Juan Ramos, "The Hollywood Percentage" directed by Eddie Romero, "Dreams" directed by Peter Ferguson, "Player A" directed by Joshua Perev and Sayulita directed by Jacob Swanson. Most recently he has performed on stage playing Stanley Kowalsky in the theater production, "The Street Car Named Desire", by Tennessee Williams (2011).

He is the son of the actress/model Evi Karagiani and Timos Ananiadis. His stepfather is the Greek actor Kostas Voutsas. One week after moving to Los Angeles, Anthimos beat out the competition to land the leading role of Joel in the Indie film 1,001 Ways to Enjoy the Missionary Position.

Personal life 
In late 2016, Ananiadis started dating dancer Maria Nefeli Gazi, during their collaboration for the theatrical play «Dorian Gray Frames». On April 21, 2018 Gazi gave birth to their son, Philipos-Dimitris Gazis, but they separated one month later.

Filmography

Movies
2016 Brief Star
2014 Foreign Relations
2013 Loud and Deep
2012 My Earl Grey
2012 Performance Anxiety
2011 Orange Inn
2009 1,001 Ways to Enjoy the Missionary Position
2006 
2005 Indolence and Camouflage: Sirens at the Aegean (Λούφα και παραλλαγή: Σειρήνες στο Αιγαίο)

Television series
2008 How to Look Good Naked
2007-2008 Maria, i Aschimi (Maria, the Ugly one)
2005 Secret Paths (Κρυφά μονοπάτια)
2005 Sole negligence (Μόνη εξ αμελείας)
2005 At Close Distance (Απόσταση Αναπνοής)
2004 Almost Never (Σχεδόν Ποτέ)

Theatre
2010 A Streetcar Named Desire
2007-2009 The Graduate
2017 Dorian Gray Frames

Video Clip
2010 Let the Guilt Go- KORN

References

Living people
1985 births
21st-century Greek male actors
Actors from Thessaloniki